Roncherolles-en-Bray (literally Roncherolles in Bray) is a commune in the Seine-Maritime department in the Normandy region in northern France.

Geography
Cristal-Fontaine mineral water is bottled here.

Population

Places of interest
 The sixteenth century church of St. Pierre & St. Paul.
 A chateau dating from the sixteenth century.

See also
Communes of the Seine-Maritime department

References

Communes of Seine-Maritime